Otto Beatty Jr. (January 26, 1940 – May 14, 2021) was a former member of the Ohio House of Representatives and was a Democrat. Beatty was an African-American. He was first elected in 1979, and was subsequently elected until 1999, when he resigned and was succeeded by his wife, Joyce Beatty.

Beatty was born in Columbus, Ohio and graduated from the University High School. He received his bachelor and masters degrees in business administration from Howard University and his law degree from Ohio State University Moritz College of Law. Beatty was admitted to the Ohio bar and practiced law in Columbus, Ohio. Beatty died on May 14, 2021.

References

External links
 

Democratic Party members of the Ohio House of Representatives
African-American state legislators in Ohio
1940 births
2021 deaths
Lawyers from Columbus, Ohio
Howard University alumni
Ohio State University Moritz College of Law alumni
20th-century African-American people
21st-century African-American people